Dimidiochromis is a genus of haplochromine cichlids endemic  to Lake Malawi in East Africa. All of its species are elongated in shape and predatory on smaller fishes.

Species
There are currently four recognized species in this genus:
 Dimidiochromis compressiceps (Boulenger, 1908) (Malawi eyebiter)
 Dimidiochromis dimidiatus (Günther, 1864) (Ncheni haplo)
 Dimidiochromis kiwinge (C. G. E. Ahl, 1926)
 Dimidiochromis strigatus (Regan, 1922) (Sunset haplo)

References

 

Cichlid genera
Taxa named by Ethelwynn Trewavas